Kit Fine (born 26 March 1946) is a British philosopher, currently university professor and Silver Professor of Philosophy and Mathematics at New York University. Prior to joining the philosophy department of NYU in 1997, he taught at the University of Edinburgh, University of California, Irvine, University of Michigan and UCLA. The author of several books and dozens of articles in international academic journals, he has made notable contributions to the fields of philosophical logic, metaphysics, and the philosophy of language and also has written on ancient philosophy, in particular on Aristotle's account of logic and modality.

He is also a distinguished research professor in the Department of Philosophy, University of Birmingham, UK. Since 2018, Fine is visiting professor at the University of Italian Switzerland.

Education, family and career
After graduating from Balliol College, Oxford (B.A., 1967), Fine received his Ph.D. from the University of Warwick in 1969, under the supervision of A. N. Prior.  He then taught at the University of Edinburgh, University of California, Irvine, University of Michigan, and UCLA, before moving to New York University.

He was elected a Corresponding Fellow of the British Academy in 2005 and a Fellow of the American Academy of Arts & Sciences in 2006. He has held fellowships from the John Simon Guggenheim Memorial Foundation and the American Council of Learned Societies and is a former editor of the Journal of Symbolic Logic.

Fine has two daughters from his former marriage to Anne Fine. Anne Fine is an author of children's books; Cordelia Fine is a professor of philosophy at the University of Melbourne; Ione Fine is a professor at the University of Washington.

Philosophical work

In addition to his primary areas of research, he has written papers in ancient philosophy, linguistics, computer science, and economic theory.

Fine has described his general approach to philosophy as follows:  "I’m firmly of the opinion that real progress in philosophy can only come from taking common sense seriously. A departure from common sense is usually an indication that a mistake has been made."

Awards 
In 2013, Fine held the Gödel Lecture, titled Truthmaker sematics.

Bibliography
 Worlds, Times, and Selves (with A. N. Prior). University of Massachusetts Press, 1977. 
 Reasoning With Arbitrary Objects. Blackwell, 1986. 
 The Limits of Abstraction. Oxford University Press, 2002. 
 Modality and Tense: Philosophical Papers. Oxford University Press, 2005. 
 Semantic Relationism. Blackwell, 2007. 
 Vagueness: A Global Approach, Oxford University Press, 2020.

Notes

References

Sources
Silver Dialogues: Kit Fine 
Kit Fine's CV

External links
 Kit Fine's web page at New York University
 KIt Fine (1946-) Internet Encyclopedia of Philosophy
 Annotated Bibliography of Kit Fine's Writings
 Kit Fine. Annotated Bibliography of the Studies on His Philosophy
 Interview with 3AM Magazine

Living people
1946 births
British philosophers
Philosophers of language
Metaphysicians
Analytic philosophers
American logicians
Corresponding Fellows of the British Academy
Fellows of the American Academy of Arts and Sciences
Alumni of the University of Warwick
University of Michigan faculty
Gödel Lecturers